Condrew Rogét Allen (born January 3, 1985) is a former American football cornerback. He was signed by the Green Bay Packers as an undrafted free agent in 2008. He played college football at Portland State.

Professional career

Green Bay Packers
Allen was signed by the Green Bay Packers as an undrafted free agent in 2008. On August 4, he was placed on injured reserve with a knee injury to make room on the active roster for Brett Favre. Allen was waived by the Packers on Aug. 8 following an injury settlement.

References

1985 births
Living people
Players of American football from Sacramento, California
American football cornerbacks
Portland State Vikings football players
Green Bay Packers players